"Can't Wait Til Tomorrow" is a song performed by Johnny Gill, issued as the second and final single from his second studio album Chemistry. The single peaked at #49 on the Billboard R&B chart in 1985.

Chart positions

References

External links
 
 

1985 singles
Cotillion Records singles
Johnny Gill songs
Song recordings produced by Linda Creed
1985 songs
Songs written by Dennis Matkosky